UHF is a Canadian folk music supergroup, consisting of singer-songwriters Bill Henderson of Chilliwack fame, Shari Ulrich and Roy Forbes. The band's name comes from the initials of the members' surnames.

The group was first formed in 1989 when Forbes and Ulrich were asked to perform with Henderson at the Vancouver Winter Roots Festival. The combination worked well, so that the three artists teamed up as UHF and produced an independent self-titled album. The trio reunited to release a second album in 1995.

Though the individual members are mostly occupied with solo careers and other projects, for many years they performed several concerts a year, including the Winnipeg Folk Festival in 1998.

Albums
 1990 – UHF
 1994 – UHF II

References

Musical groups established in 1989
Musical groups from Vancouver
Canadian folk music groups
1989 establishments in British Columbia